The Yeti is a  magazine published in Tallahassee, Florida since 2005. It is published with the help of Florida State University and Campus Progress and is currently edited by Perry Peruccelli.

History
The first issue of The Yeti was published in April 2005 by a team of Florida State University writing students who noticed the lack of an independent voice in the community. The students established The Yeti as an official organization on the Florida State campus and acquired assistance from Campus Progress soon after.

In Summer 2011, The Yeti brought on a team of new staff members, revamping the image and function of the magazine. A hip hop song was recorded with local musicians S.B.E. and a music video was shot. During that time The Strozier Library at Florida State University began an archive of the physical history of the publication in the Special Collections department.

References

External links
 Official website
 Issue Archive at Issuu
 "The Yeti Collection" at FSU Libraries

2005 establishments in Florida
Literary magazines published in the United States
Student magazines published in the United States
Quarterly magazines published in the United States
Florida State University
Magazines established in 2005
Magazines published in Florida
Mass media in Tallahassee, Florida